Bob Blewett (June 28, 1877 – March 17, 1958) was a Major League Baseball player for the New York Giants in 1902 as a pitcher.

Biography
Blewett was born Robert Lawrence Blewett on June 28, 1877, in Fond du Lac, Wisconsin. He attended Beloit College. Blewett died on March 17, 1958, in Sedro Woolley, Washington.

Blewett served as president of the Pacific Coast League, circa 1918.

References

External links

1877 births
1958 deaths
Sportspeople from Fond du Lac, Wisconsin
Baseball players from Wisconsin
New York Giants (NL) players
Major League Baseball pitchers
Toronto Royals players
Montreal Royals players
Toronto Maple Leafs (International League) players
Olympia Senators players
Seattle Siwashes players
Tacoma Tigers players
Boise Fruit Pickers players
Beloit Buccaneers baseball players